Litotenes is a genus of moths belonging to the family Tortricidae.

Species
Litotenes ioplecta Diakonoff, 1973

See also
List of Tortricidae genera

References

External links
tortricidae.com

Tortricidae genera